Issam Saliba, a Lebanese-Canadian surgeon based in Montreal, Canada, is an otolaryngologist who developed a faster and less expensive technique for treating ruptured eardrums.
  
The technique can be performed in 20 minutes during a routine visit to an ear, nose and throat specialist.
 
Saliba is a researcher at the Sainte-Justine University Hospital Centre affiliated with the Université de Montréal.  His new discovery won second prize at Quebec Science, 2012.

References

1961 births
Living people
People from Montreal
Canadian otolaryngologists
Academic staff of the Université de Montréal